Paula Ribó is a Spanish voice actress and musician, who has dubbed over 300 films and television shows into Peninsular Spanish and Catalan. Starting as a child actress, she has continued voicing child characters.

Among her animated roles, she voices two Disney Princesses: Merida in Spanish and Catalan and Anna in Catalan. She also voices Poppy in the Trolls franchise; Margo in the Despicable Me franchise; and voiced Chihiro in the Spanish and Catalan versions of Spirited Away. On television, she voiced the lead role of Caillou in Caillou for most of its Spanish and Catalan run, switching to Caillou's younger sister towards the end. Dubbing live-action, Ribó has voiced three characters from the Harry Potter franchise in Catalan: Ginny Weasley for the first six movies; Hermione Grainger in the seventh movie; and Chastity Barebone in the Fantastic Beasts and Where to Find Them spin-off. She has dubbed into Spanish the young Harriet Vanger in all adaptations of Stieg Larsson's Millennium trilogy. In the Twilight saga she dubbed the voice of Angela Weber.

Ribó is or has been the habitual Peninsular Spanish and/or Catalan dubbing voice of Abigail Breslin, Dakota and Elle Fanning, Rachel Hurd-Wood, Anna Kendrick, Chloë Grace Moretz, Liliana Mumy, Hayden Panettiere, AnnaSophia Robb, Emma Roberts, Hailee Steinfeld, Emma Stone, Emma Watson, and Shailene Woodley.

Roles all sourced to El Doblaje (Spanish) and El Doblatge (Catalan).

Animation

Film

Television

Video games

Live-action

Film

Television

Commercials

References

Actress filmographies
Spanish filmographies